Events in the year 2021 in Yemen.

Incumbents

Events
Ongoing — COVID-19 pandemic in Yemen — The Houthi–Saudi Arabian conflict (since 2015) — The Yemeni Civil War (2014–present)

22 February – Starting of the Battle of Marib.
25 February – Adoption of the United Nations Security Council Resolution 2564, calling for sanctions in Yemen.

Deaths
10 May – Sami Hasan Al Nash, football manager (born 1957).
13 May – , writer, poet and songwriter (born 1930).
24 May – Najeeb Qahtan al-Shaabi, politician.
25 May – Abdul Wahab Al-Dailami, politician, minister of justice (born 1938).
12 July – Mohammed bin Ismail Al Amrani, judge (born 1921).
28 September – Nasser al-Awlaki, politician, minister of agriculture (born 1946).

References

 

 
2020s in Yemen
Years of the 21st century in Yemen
Yemen
Yemen